Jaintia Hills District was a district in Meghalaya, India that was established in 1972 with headquarters at Jowai which was taken from the United Khasi Jaintia Hills District Council. It was once part of the ancient Jaintia Kingdom. The present inhabitants of the District are the Pnar, the War, the Bhoi (Karbis), Tiwa (Lalung) and the Biates
In 2012 the district has been bifurcated into two districts:-
 East Jaintia Hills district headquartered at Khliehriat
 West Jaintia Hills district headquartered at Jowai

References

1972 establishments in Meghalaya
2012 disestablishments in India
Former districts of Meghalaya